Wilkerson Place is a historic house in Giles County, Tennessee, U.S.. It was built in the 1830s. By 1847, it belonged to Allen Wilkerson, a settler from North Carolina. The porch was built in 1857. It has been listed on the National Register of Historic Places since October 23, 1986.

References

Houses on the National Register of Historic Places in Tennessee
Federal architecture in Tennessee
Greek Revival architecture in Tennessee
Houses completed in 1830
Houses in Giles County, Tennessee